National Weather Service Quad Cities is a National Weather Service forecast office. weather forecast office based in Davenport, Iowa. It is tasked with providing weather and emergency information to 21 counties in east-central and southeast Iowa, 13 counties in northwest and west-central Illinois, and two counties in extreme northeast Missouri.

History 
The Quad Cities Weather office was established on May 24, 1871, starting out on the third floor of the First National Bank building at Second and Main Streets in Davenport. The office would move around Davenport several times over the course of the next sixty-five years before relocating across the state line to the Moline airport (now known as Quad Cities International Airport) in October 1936.

In October 1993, construction on a new facility for the Quad Cities office began near Davenport Municipal Airport, and the Quad Cities NWS began the transition from Moline back to Davenport, a move that was completed by February 1995. The following month, the Quad Cities office's county warning area expanded to 34 counties – 21 in Iowa and 13 in Illinois. In November 1999, the St. Louis NWS office transferred responsibility for Clark and Scotland counties in extreme northeast Missouri to the Quad Cities weather office, bringing the total number of counties in the Quad Cities office's county warning area to its present number of 36.

In June 2017, the Quad Cities office moved into a new facility, also on the grounds of Davenport Municipal Airport.

NOAA Weather Radio 
The Quad Cities forecast office operates the following eleven NOAA Weather Radio transmitters to broadcast weather forecasts, watches, warnings, and other relevant emergency information to persons in its county warning area, as well as adjacent counties served by other NWS forecast offices:

References

External links 
NWS Quad Cities Main Page
NOAA Weather Radio Coverage Maps

Quad Cities
Davenport, Iowa